Newcomer Mansion is a historic home located near Martinsburg, Berkeley County, West Virginia. It was built about 1820 and consists of a -story, three-bay, Federal-style brick house with a two-story, two bay by one bay log house appended. The main section measures 33 feet by 36 feet.  Also on the property is a contributing garage (1940).  It was built by Jacob Newcomer, a son of Christian Newcomer (1749–1830), one of the founders of the Church of the United Brethren in Christ denomination.

In conjunction with a Section 106 study associated with improvements to Route 9, Newcomer Mansion was determined eligible for the National Register by the West Virginia State Historic Preservation Officer on August 7, 1997; this Determination of Eligibility was affirmed by the Keeper of the National Register on July 24, 1998.

It was listed on the National Register of Historic Places in 2006.

References

Houses on the National Register of Historic Places in West Virginia
Federal architecture in West Virginia
Houses completed in 1820
Houses in Berkeley County, West Virginia
National Register of Historic Places in Berkeley County, West Virginia